Vorobyovsky District  is an administrative and municipal district (raion), one of the thirty-two in Voronezh Oblast, Russia. It is located in the east of the oblast. Its administrative center is the rural locality (a selo) of Vorobyovka. Population:  The population of Vorobyovka accounts for 24.0% of the district's total population.

References

Notes

Sources

Districts of Voronezh Oblast